Bobbi Jo Hart (née Krals; born January 22, 1966) is an American-Canadian documentary filmmaker based in Montreal, Quebec. Hart was born in California and raised in Cottage Grove, Oregon. She is most noted for her films Rebels on Pointe, which won the award for Best Canadian Feature at the Inside Out Film and Video Festival in 2017 and received a Canadian Screen Award nomination for Best Biography or Arts Documentary Program or Series at the 7th Canadian Screen Awards in 2019, and Fanny: The Right to Rock, which won the Rogers Audience Award at the Hot Docs Canadian International Documentary Festival and the award for Best Canadian Film at Inside Out in 2021.

Her other films have included A Calling to Care (2001), She Got Game (2003), I Am Not a Rock Star (2012) and Rise (2015).

References

External links

American documentary film directors
American expatriates in Canada
American women film directors
Canadian documentary film directors
Canadian women film directors
Film directors from Montreal
Film directors from Oregon
Living people
People from Lane County, Oregon
Year of birth missing (living people)
Canadian women documentary filmmakers